This is a list of Members of the Legislative Council in the colonial period (excluding official members) from 30 October 1985 to 25 August 1988 after the first ever elections to the Council were held on 26 September 1985.

After the elections, there were 11 Official Members (including four ex officio), and 46 Unofficial Members, of whom 22 were appointed by the Governor, 12 elected from functional constituencies, one elected from among members of the Urban Council, one elected from among members of the Regional Council, and 10 elected by an electoral college constituency made up of members of all district boards.

List of Members of the Legislative Council
Members who did not serve throughout the term are italicised.

References
 Database on LegCo Members

See also
 1985 Hong Kong legislative election

Legislative Council of Hong Kong